Puerto Rico Highway 29 (PR-29) is an avenue in the city of Bayamón, Puerto Rico. It connects from the PR-2 (in Hato Tejas) to the PR-5, intersects the PR-167 at Plaza del Sol (a major commercial centers of Bayamón). This road is called Avenida Main Oeste.

Major intersections

See also

 List of highways numbered 29

References

External links
 

029
Bayamón, Puerto Rico